Vierlinden is a municipality in the district Märkisch-Oderland, in Brandenburg, Germany.

History
The municipality was created on 26 October 2003 after the merging of the municipalities of Diedersdorf, Friedersdorf, Marxdorf and Worin.

Geography
Vierlinden is composed by 7 civil parishes (Ortsteile):
 Alt Rosenthal
 Diedersdorf
 Friedersdorf
 Görlsdorf
 Marxdorf
 Neuentempel
 Worin

Demography

References

External links

 

Localities in Märkisch-Oderland